The women's foil was one of eight fencing events on the fencing at the 1992 Summer Olympics programme. It was the fourteenth appearance of the event. The competition was held on 30 July 1992. 46 fencers from 19 nations competed.

Competition format

The 1992 tournament used a three-phase format roughly similar to prior years in consisting of a group phase, a double-elimination phase, and a single-elimination phase, but each phase was very different from previous formats.

The first phase was a single round (vs. 3 rounds in 1988) round-robin pool play format; each fencer in a pool faced each other fencer in that pool once. There were 7 pools with 6 or 7 fencers each. The fencers' ranks within the pool were ignored; the overall winning percentage (with touch differential and then touches against used as tie-breakers) were used to rank the fencers. The top 36 advanced to the second phase, while the other fencers were eliminated.

The second phase was a modified, truncated double-elimination tournament. 28 fencers received a bye to the second round (round of 32), while the 8 fencers ranked 29–36 played in the round of 64. Fencers losing in the round of 64 were eliminated, while the remaining rounds were double elimination via repechages. The repechages (but not the main brackets) used a complicated reseeding mechanism. Ultimately, the 4 fencers remaining undefeated after the round of 8 advanced to the quarterfinals along with 4 fencers who advanced through the repechages after one loss.

The final phase was a single elimination tournament with quarterfinals, semifinals, and a final and bronze medal match.

All bouts were to 5 touches. In the second and third phases, matches were best-of-three bouts.

Results

Group round

Fencers were ranked by win percent, then touch differential, then touches against. This ranking, with adjustments to ensure that no two fencers of the same nation were in the same bracket (noted in parentheses), was used to seed the elimination round brackets.

Elimination rounds

Main brackets

Main bracket 1

O'Neill was eliminated after the round of 64. The losers in the round of 32 faced off, with Stefanek beating Maciejewska and I beating Castillejo to advance to the repechage. The losers of the round of 16, Tremblay and Funkenhauser, advanced directly to the first round of the repechage. Wang, having lost in the round of 8, went to the third round of the repechage. McIntosh won the bracket, advancing to the quarterfinals.

Repechage qualifiers 1

Main bracket 2 

Takayanagi was eliminated after the round of 64. The losers in the round of 32 faced off, with Spennato beating Savić-Šotra and Grigorescu beating Aubin to advance to the repechage. The losers of the round of 16, Xiao and Némethné Jánosi, advanced directly to the first round of the repechage. Velichko, having lost in the round of 8, went to the third round of the repechage. Zalaffi won the bracket, advancing to the quarterfinals.

Repechage qualifiers 2

Main bracket 3 

Esquerdo was eliminated after the round of 64. The losers in the round of 32 faced off, with Bortolozzi-Borella beating Bilodeaux and Czuckermann-Hatuel beating Aubin to advance to the repechage. The losers of the round of 16, Sobczak and Guzganu-Tufan, advanced directly to the first round of the repechage. Modaine-Cessac, having lost in the round of 8, went to the third round of the repechage. Bau won the bracket, advancing to the quarterfinals.

Repechage qualifiers 3

Main bracket 4 

Esquerdo was eliminated after the round of 64. The losers in the round of 32 faced off, with Sadovskaya beating Mincza and Meygret beating E to advance to the repechage. The losers of the round of 16, Wolnicka-Szewczyk and Guzganu-Tufan, advanced directly to the first round of the repechage. Sin, having lost in the round of 8, went to the third round of the repechage. Lazăr-Szabo won the bracket, advancing to the quarterfinals.

Repechage qualifiers 4

Repechage rounds 1 and 2 

The fencers were reseeded: the eight fencers who had lost in the round of 16 were reseeded as 1–8 while the eight fencers who had lost in the round of 32 but won the repechage qualifiers were reseeded as 9–16. For example, original seed #1 Stefanek was reseeded as #9 because she was the top-seeded fencer who had advanced through the repechage qualifiers. Seeds were adjusted to avoid rematches from the main bracket—Meygret and Sadovskaya were swapped to avoid a Meygret–Sin rematch. Original seeds are shown in parentheses in the brackets.

Repechage rounds 1 and 2 bracket 1

Repechage rounds 1 and 2 bracket 2

Repechage rounds 1 and 2 bracket 3

Repechage rounds 1 and 2 bracket 4

Repechage round 3 

The fencers were reseeded again. Seeds 1–4 were given to round 8 losers, based on their original seeds (excluding adjustments to avoid having multiple fencers from the same nation in a bracket, which affected Köves and Nolte). Seeds 5–8 were given to the winners of the second round of the repechage, based on their original seeds.

Repechage round 3 bracket 1

Repechage round 3 bracket 2

Repechage round 3 bracket 3

Repechage round 3 bracket 4

Final rounds

The fencers were reseeded a final time. Seeds 1–4 were given to the round of 8 winners, based on their original seeds. Seeds 5–8 were given to the winners of the third round of the repechage, based on their original seeds.

Final classification

References

Foil women
1992 in women's fencing
Women's events at the 1992 Summer Olympics